Cantharellus amethysteus, the amethyst chanterelle, is a species of Cantharellus from Europe.

Description 
Cantharellus amethysteus is an edible chanterelle species with white flesh which turns yellow as it ages.

Cap: 5-10cm. Flat topped to start with depression forming. Downy texture with irregular, wavy edges. Stem: 3-4cm. Tapers downwards, often flattened or twisted. Veins/ridges: Thick and decurrent. Paler colour than the cap.  Taste: Mild. Smell: Mild and pleasant, faint smell of apricots. Spore print: white to palish yellow sometimes with a pink tinge. Spores: Cylindrical to elongated ellipsoid, smooth, non-amyloid. 8-10 x 5.5-6 μm.

References

External links
 
 

amethysteus
Fungi described in 1887